Christine "Chris" Essel is the President of Southern California Grantmakers (SCG), a regional association of philanthropic leaders whose mission is to support and advance effective, responsible philanthropy for the public good. SCG’s members include family, community, private, corporate and public foundations, as well as individual grantmakers. As president, Ms. Essel sets the strategic direction and priorities for the organization, overseeing programming, communications, member services and public policy.
She joined SCG as President on February 1, 2013.

Prior to SCG, Essel was the Chief Executive Officer of the Community Redevelopment Agency, Los Angeles and the former Senior Vice President at Paramount Pictures leading the planning and development as well as government and community relations departments. She was a candidate in the December 8, 2009 general election for Los Angeles City Council District 2.

Education

A long-time San Fernando Valley resident, she is a graduate of Valley public schools including Shirley Ave. Elementary, Sutter Jr. High, and Chatsworth High School. Essel attended Cal State Northridge and finished her education with a Bachelor of Science in Business Administration degree from Redlands University.

Career

Senior Vice President of Paramount Pictures

In the late seventies, she moved into her first home in Studio City when she began working as an accountant at a small entertainment business. Essel began her tenure at Paramount Pictures managing budgets as a facilities accountant, and worked her way up to become a Senior Vice President managing various studio functions.

At Paramount, she oversaw the creation of hundreds of jobs as she worked to rebuild the dilapidated Paramount lot into a state-of-the-art production facility. Essel also created mentoring, internship, and environmental programs at Paramount.

Los Angeles municipal appointments
She served California and the City of Los Angeles as an appointed commissioner on numerous boards; currently, she  is the Vice Chair of the California Workforce Investment Board and from 1999 to 2007, she was chair of the California Film Commission where she is still a board member.

In 1992, she was appointed to the Community Redevelopment Agency (CRA) board by Los Angeles Mayor Tom Bradley and was reappointed by the succeeding mayor, Richard Riordan. After being elected commission chairwoman, she led the effort to turn around Hollywood Boulevard to make it a safe and attractive destination for tourists and L.A. residents. Essel also led efforts to develop what became the Agency’s stringent green building guidelines.

She also served on Tom Bradley’s Hollywood Mobility Action Committees. Most recently, she served as a Los Angeles World Airports Commissioner, but resigned from the post to run for the Los Angeles City Council.

Community service
She has also volunteered as a neighborhood organizer. When Los Angeles County decided to allow a rock promoter to hold events at the John Anson Ford Theater, Chris created the Hollywood Terrace Homeowners and worked successfully with Los Angeles County and Los Angeles Police Department to stop the events and return the theater to its appropriate status as an acoustic-only venue.

Campaign for City Council

In June 2009, Essel announced her candidacy for the vacant 2nd District Los Angeles City Council seat, most recently held by Los Angeles City Controller Wendy Greuel. Essel's candidacy was endorsed by Greuel, former Los Angeles Mayor Richard Riordan, City Attorney Carmen Trutanich, State Senator Fran Pavley, the majority of the Los Angeles City Council as well as the 16 IATSE west coast studio locals, AFSCME DC 36, Los Angeles Fire Department Chief Officers Association and most of Southern California's building trades locals.  Essel was also endorsed by the Los Angeles Times.
She placed 2nd in the September 22nd, 2009 Primary election (a field of 10 which included Los Angeles Unified School District Boardmember Tamar Galatzan) to reach a December runoff election against then-Assemblyman Paul Krekorian. Krekorian won the election, which was bitterly contested.

References 

American media executives
Women in California politics
Living people
People from Studio City, Los Angeles
Year of birth missing (living people)
21st-century American women
California State University, Northridge alumni